The 1970 South American Championships was a men's tennis tournament that was part of the 1970 Pepsi-Cola Grand Prix and held in Buenos Aires, Argentina. It was the third edition of the tournament and ran from 31 October through 8 November 1970. It was played on outdoor clay courts. Željko Franulović won the singles title.

Finals

Singles

 Željko Franulović defeated  Manuel Orantes 6–4, 6–2, 6–0 
 It was Franulovic's 3rd ATP title of the year and the 4th of his ATP career.

Doubles
 Bob Carmichael /  Ray Ruffels defeated  Željko Franulović /  Jan Kodeš 7–5, 6–2, 5–7, 6–7, 6–3 
 It was Carmichael's only ATP title of the year and the 1st of his ATP career. It was Ruffels's 3rd ATP title of the year and the 3rd of his ATP career.

References

External links 
 ITF tournament edition details

 
Buenos Aires Grand Prix
South American Championships (tennis)
Davis
Davis